Operation Project 56 was a series of 4 nuclear tests conducted by the United States in 1955–1956 at the Nevada Test Site. These tests followed the Operation Wigwam series and preceded the Operation Redwing series.

Introduction 

These experiments were safety tests, the purpose of which were to determine whether a weapon or warhead damaged in an accident would detonate with a nuclear yield, even if some or all of the high explosive components burned or detonated. The procedure for these tests was to fault the test bomb by removing a detonator wire, or perhaps all but one, for example, possibly enhancing the weapon with extra initiators or an especially enriched core, and then to fire the weapon normally (see Warhead design safety). If there is any nuclear yield in the firing, then the test is deemed a failure from a safety standpoint. A successful test will measure only the chemical explosive in the test bomb exploding, which still, of course, blasts the bomb core and causes the core material to be spread over a wide area if the test is in open air, as all the Project 56 tests were.

Aftermath 

Over  of Area 11 at the NTS were contaminated with plutonium dust and fragments. The area has become known as Plutonium Valley, and continues to be used on an intermittent basis for realistic drills in radiological monitoring and sampling operations.

See also 

 Project 57
 Operation Roller Coaster
 Nuclear weapon design

Further reading 

* Hansen, Chuck, "Swords of Armageddon" (CD-ROM & download available). PDF. 2,600 pages, Sunnyvale, California, Chucklea Publications, 1995, 2007.  (2nd Ed.)

References

Explosions in 1955
Explosions in 1956
Project 56
1955 in military history
1956 in military history
1955 in Nevada
1956 in Nevada
1955 in the environment
1956 in the environment